Bacchisa mindanaonis is a species of beetle in the family Cerambycidae. It was described by Breuning in 1959. It is known from the Philippines.

References

M
Beetles described in 1959